Strahnairn may refer to:

 Strathnairn, an area of the Scottish Highlands approximately 8 miles southwest of Inverness
 Strathnairn, Australian Capital Territory, a suburb in the Belconnen district of Canberra, Australia
 Strathnairn Homestead, Australian Capital Territory, a homestead in the Australian Capital Territory dates from the 1920s